The Aayash Dam is a dam in Saudi Arabia opened in 2005 and located in Asir region. The main purpose of the dam is flood control.

See also 

 List of dams in Saudi Arabia

References 

Dams in Saudi Arabia